"Scenario" is the third single from A Tribe Called Quest's second album The Low End Theory. The song features members of the rap group Leaders of the New School. Matt Cibula of PopMatters called the track hip-hop's greatest posse cut. The song is commonly considered a breakout moment for Leaders of the New School member Busta Rhymes, who was 19 when this song was released. Time included the song on its list of its All-TIME 100 Songs.

The song opens with the chorus, followed by verses from Phife Dawg, Charlie Brown, Dinco D, and Q-Tip, who hands the mic off to Busta Rhymes.

The music video, directed by Jim Swaffield, plays on an interactive desktop, and features cameo appearances by Spike Lee, De La Soul, Kid Capri, Brand Nubian, Fab Five Freddy, and Redman.

A remixed version of "Scenario" appeared on the B-side of the 12" single, the cassette single, and the limited edition release of the group's later album, The Love Movement (1998). The remix also features Leaders of the New School and newcomer Kid Hood, who was murdered three days after recording his verse. Blender magazine ranked the "Scenario" remix at number 216 in its list of "The 500 Greatest Songs Since You Were Born".

Samples
 "Oblighetto" by Brother Jack McDuff 
 "Little Miss Lover" by Jimi Hendrix 
 "Soul Vibrations" and "Funky Granny" by Kool & the Gang [sample appears on  remix only]
 "Ecstasy" by Ohio Players [sample appears on the remix only]
 "Blind Alley" by The Emotions [sample appears on the remix only]

Charts

Weekly charts

Certifications

References

External links 
 Video at YouTube (streamed copy where licensed)
 Lyrics and musical notation at www.rapanalysis.com

1991 songs
1992 singles
A Tribe Called Quest songs
Song recordings produced by Q-Tip (musician)
Songs written by Q-Tip (musician)
Songs written by Busta Rhymes
Jive Records singles
Songs written by Ali Shaheed Muhammad
Songs written by Phife Dawg
Posse cuts